Bonakele Amos Majuba (born 10 May 1968) is a South African politician and educator who has served as the MEC (Member of the Executive Council) for Education in Mpumalanga since May 2019. A member of the African National Congress, he has been a Member of the Mpumalanga Provincial Legislature since May 2009. Majuba was the deputy speaker of the provincial legislature between March 2018 and May 2019.

Early life and education
Majuba matriculated from Mehlomakhulu Senior Secondary School and then went on to study at the then Transvaal College of Education where he achieved his senior teachers diploma in 1991. He worked as a teacher at St Joseph's Comprehensive School from 1992 to 2000.

Political career
Majuba was elected as the regional secretary of the South African Democratic Teachers Union for the Western regional office in KwaMhlanga in 2001. He was elected as the SADTU Deputy Provincial Secretary in 2006. In 2004, Majuba was elected as the deputy chairperson of the South African Communist Party's Ephraim Mogale District.

From 2007 to 2008, Majuba was the acting provincial secretary of the SACP in Mpumalanga. He was also elected deputy president of SADTU in 2008. After the 2009 provincial election, Majuba became a Member of the Mpumalanga Provincial Legislature for the African National Congress. He was then elected as the provincial secretary of the SACP later in 2009. He was a member of the provincial legislature's Standing Committee on Public Accounts, the education committee, and many other committees during the fourth legislative term (2009 to 2014). Majuba also served as the chairperson of the Public Works, Roads and Transport committee from 2009 to 2012. Following the 2014 provincial elections, Majuba was appointed to five committees. He was elected as the deputy speaker of the provincial legislature in March 2018.

Following the 2019 provincial election, premier Refilwe Mtsweni-Tsipane appointed Majuba as the Member of the Executive Council (MEC) for the Mpumalanga Department of Education.

References

External links

Living people
1968 births
People from Mpumalanga
21st-century South African politicians
Members of the Mpumalanga Provincial Legislature
African National Congress politicians
South African Communist Party politicians